Buxhall is a village and a civil parish in the Mid Suffolk district, in the county of Suffolk, England. The nearest town is Stowmarket. It is home to a public house, St Mary's Church, Buxhall Windmill, and a village recreation ground with children's play area.

The antiquarian Walter Arthur Copinger published his History of the parish of Buxhall in the county of Suffolk which featured twenty four illustrations by William Ayliffe.

References 

 Philip's Street Atlas Suffolk (page 66)

External links 

 Buxhall Village Website

Villages in Suffolk
Mid Suffolk District
Civil parishes in Suffolk